Rodriguezus is a genus of crabs in the family Pseudothelphusidae, containing the following species:
 Rodriguezus garmani (Rathbun, 1898)
 Rodriguezus iturbei (Rathbun, 1919)
 Rodriguezus ranchograndensis (Rodríguez, 1966)
 Rodriguezus trujillensis (Rodríguez, 1967)

References

Pseudothelphusidae